Morse Field is a former military airfield located approximately  south-southwest of Naālehu, Hawaii. It was also known as South Cape Airport, South Point Air Force Station, or Ka Lae Military Reservation. It is now abandoned.

History

Morse Field
In 1941 construction was underway on five buildings, runways, and access roads at Morse Field. Construction work, originally under the Zone Constructing Quartermaster, was transferred to the District Engineer in late 1940. A total of $1,534,793 was requested from the War Department in May for completion of the project; this amount later increased to $2,020,000.

The work on the Morse Field was an earth field with a marston mat runways at Morse Field was suspended shortly after the December 7, 1941 Japanese attack on Hawaii, and all adjacent landing areas demolished and the strip destroyed as a precautionary measure against enemy use. By 28 December 1941, gasoline storage facilities were complete, a water line installed, and mobilization buildings were more than half finished. These projects were all that were deemed appropriate for continuance at the time.

Blocking of landing areas on the island occupied large amounts of time and manpower due to the extensive areas involved and the comparatively smooth surfaces surrounding the field, which could be used as landing fields.

After World War II it was declared surplus and on January 16, 1948, a right of entry from the U.S. Army to the Territory of Hawaii was approved. It was not until August 30, 1952 that the property was finally restored to the Territory by Executive Order.

South Point Air Force Station
In December 1964, General Bernard A. Schriever of the AFSC announced that the Air Force would assume control of space tracking and communications from the Navy at South Point on 1 February 1965. Then on 30 September 1965, the Station was closed.

It was later reopened, however, in support of Project Have Lent, a sounding rocket probe program to evaluate advanced ballistic reentry system experiments. The close proximity and aspect angle of South Point to the optical site sensors located on the island of Maui were the primary reasons for launching the probes from this location.

One of the sites was the main operations area, while the other areas was used for a boresight tower.

The Station was under the operational control of the Space and Missile Test Center (SAMTEC).

South Point AFS was one of the few Air Force installations in the State of Hawaii that did not fall under the control of the 15th Air Base Wing at Hickam AFB. It belonged to the Air Force Systems Command (AFSC), with headquarters at Andrews AFB.

Final closing
On February 11, 1983, the facilities at the former Morse Field were formally closed by the governor's executive order.

See also

 Hawaii World War II Army Airfields

References

 Shaw, Frederick J. (2004), Locating Air Force Base Sites History’s Legacy, Air Force History and Museums Program, United States Air Force, Washington DC, 2004.
 Abandoned & Little-Known Airfields: Hawaii, Hawaii island
 15th Air Base Wing History Office via Hawaii Aviation

External links

1941 establishments in Hawaii
Airfields of the United States Army Air Forces in Hawaii
Buildings and structures in Hawaii County, Hawaii
Defunct airports in Hawaii
1983 disestablishments in Hawaii